Jesús Alberto Alvarado Morín (born 4 October 1988) is a Mexican professional footballer. Besides Mexico, he has played in Finland, Moldova, and Belarus.

Honours
Individual
Liga de Expansión MX Golden Boot (Shared): Guardianes 2020

References

External links 
 
 Profile at Neman Grodno website

1988 births
Living people
Mexican footballers
Association football forwards
Mexican expatriate footballers
Expatriate footballers in Finland
Expatriate footballers in Moldova
Expatriate footballers in Belarus
Mexican expatriate sportspeople in Finland
Mexican expatriate sportspeople in Moldova
Mexican expatriate sportspeople in Belarus
Potros UAEM footballers
CSF Bălți players
FF Jaro players
AC Oulu players
FC Neman Grodno players
Correcaminos UAT footballers
Ykkönen players
Moldovan Super Liga players
Belarusian Premier League players
C.D. Tepatitlán de Morelos players
Cimarrones de Sonora players